= Day Mountain =

Mountain in West Virginia, United States

Coordinates: 38.2542°N 80.1687°W

Day Mountain is a summit in West Virginia, in the United States. With an elevation of 4,301 feet (1,311 m), Day Mountain is the 54th highest summit in the state of West Virginia.

Day Mountain was named after Charles Day, according to local history.
